Oleg Yuryevich Zelenin (born 4 March 1989) is a former Russian professional football player.

Club career
He played in the Russian Football National League for FC Zvezda Irkutsk in 2008.

External links
 
 Career summary by sportbox.ru
 

1989 births
Living people
Russian footballers
Association football midfielders
FC Zvezda Irkutsk players
FC Baikal Irkutsk players